Pyrausta cingulata, the silver-barred sable, is a species of moth of the family Crambidae. It was described by Carl Linnaeus in his 1758 10th edition of Systema Naturae. It is found in Europe.

The wingspan is 14–18 mm. The forewings are blackish with a narrow very slightly sinuate white fascia beyond middle ; tips of cilia white. Hindwings are as forewings, but fascia slightly curved.
The moth flies from May to August depending on the location.

The larvae probably feed on wild thyme (Thymus polytrichus).

References

External links
 
 Pyrausta cingulata at UKMoths

cingulata
Moths described in 1758
Moths of Europe
Taxa named by Carl Linnaeus